Ricardo Nuno Pinto Fernandes (born 20 February 1986) is a Portuguese futsal player who plays as a winger for Póvoa Futsal and the Portugal national team.

References

External links

1986 births
Living people
People from Matosinhos
Portuguese men's futsal players
AR Freixieiro players
S.L. Benfica futsal players
Sportspeople from Porto District